FM2 may refer to:
 Socket FM2, an APU socket for AMD processors
 Nikon FM2, a camera
 FM-2 Wildcat, a fighter aircraft
 Lockheed XFM-2, a fighter aircraft
 FM2, an album by Foster & McElroy
 Farm to Market Road 2, a state-maintained highway in the U.S. state of Texas
 FM2 (radio station), a radio station in the Philippines
 Front Mission 2, a tactical role-playing game